The 1920–21 Challenge Cup was the 21st staging of rugby league's oldest knockout competition, the Challenge Cup.

First round

Second round

Quarterfinals

Semifinals

Final
Leigh defeated Halifax 13-0 in the final played at The Cliff, Broughton in front of a crowd of 25,000. 

This was Leigh’s first Challenge Cup final win in their first final appearance.

References

Challenge Cup
Challenge Cup